Portrait of Cardinal Cristoforo Madruzzo is an oil painting by Titian, signed and dated 1552, which hangs in the São Paulo Museum of Art.

Description 
The youthful prelate, Cristoforo Madruzzo, Prince Bishop of Trent, and afterwards Cardinal, is dressed entirely in black silk, and turns half round to the front as he walks, while he lifts with his hand a red curtain, behind which is seen his writing-table covered with a green cloth.

Analysis 
This is one of the few examples of a full-length portrait by Titian's hand. Giovanni Morelli and Charles Ricketts attributed it erroneously to Moroni. The picture affected Ricketts (in reproduction: he had not seen the original) as a late picture by Moroni; he thought it gauche in painting (noting the "clumsy short thumbs") and design. This was also the impression of Morelli, basing his opinion upon a photograph.

Vasari mentions this portrait just after the one of the Ambassador Mendozza, done in 1541; and according to Georg Gronau his indication is confirmed by a letter dated July 1642, in which the portrait is mentioned as finished. Gronau therefore thought it was produced in the first months of the year 1542. An article in the Gazette des Beaux Arts corrected the date to 1552. The work is signed and dated, "1.5.5.2. / TITIAN FECIT".

Provenance 
Formerly in the Castle of Trent, it remained in the Madruzzo family, and passing through various hands, it came in 1836 to the Salvadori and the collection of Barone Valentino de Salvadori. By 1910 it was in the collection of James Stillman in the United States. The picture passed through many hands, and was acquired by the São Paulo Museum of Art in 1951.

Gallery

References

Sources 

 Gronau, Georg (1904). Titian. London: Duckworth and Co; New York: Charles Scribner's Sons. pp. 128, 269, 275.
 Ricketts, Charles (1910). Titian. London: Methuen & Co. Ltd. p. 100.
 "Retrato do cardeal Cristoforo Madruzzo, 1552". MASP. Retrieved 23 November 2022.

Further reading 

 Roblot-Delondre (May 1909). "Les Portraits D'Isabelle de Portugal Épouse de Charles-Quint". Gazette des Beaux-Arts. 51e Année. 623e Livraison. / 4e Période. Tome I. pp. 435–442.
 Museu de Arte de São Paulo. 2nd ed. Edições Melhormentos, 1978. p. 30.

Portraits by Titian
Paintings in the collection of the São Paulo Museum of Art